Max Wilhelm Waldemar Dungert (3 September 1896, Magdeburg - April/May 1945, Berlin) was a German painter and graphic artist.

Life and work 
He was born to Ferdinand Dungert, a police courier, and his wife Betty Elise née Koehler. In 1919, he was one of the co-founders of a short-lived artists' association known as "" (The Sphere); devoted to Expressionist art. After 1920, his works would briefly display a trend toward Realism.

In 1921, he went to Berlin and joined the Novembergruppe, another association of Expressionist artists and architects. Later, he would also create works in the Cubist style. During the next few years, he occasionally shared a studio with Beye. From 1925 to 1928, he made several study trips to Italy, France, and Switzerland. He established his own private drawing school in 1930, and joined "Porza" (named after the city in Switzerland), an international association for intellectual and artistic exchanges.

During the Nazi regime, in 1937, several of his works were confiscated as part of the campaign to identify and eliminate "Degenerate Art". He was drafted into military service in 1944. His studio and many of his works were destroyed not long after. He was killed sometime during, or immediately following, the Battle of Berlin.
 
In addition to his paintings, in 1925 he created stained glass windows for a dancing school operated by Berthe Trümpy (1895-1983), which were destroyed during the war. He also produced portrait sketches of notable musicians and composers, such as Kurt Weill, Paul Hindemith and the French singer, Yvette Guilbert.

His works may be seen at the Kulturhistorisches Museum Magdeburg, and the Berlinische Galerie. The city of Magdeburg has named a street after him.

References

Further reading 
 
 Renate Hagedorn: "Dungert, Max Wilhelm Waldemar", In: Guido Heinrich, Gunter Schandera (Eds.): Magdeburger Biographisches Lexikon 19. und 20. Jahrhundert. Biographisches Lexikon für die Landeshauptstadt Magdeburg und die Landkreise Bördekreis, Jerichower Land, Ohrekreis und Schönebeck. Scriptum, Magdeburg 2002, 
 Martin Wiehle: Magdeburger Persönlichkeiten. Edited by the Magistrat der Stadt Magdeburg, Dezernat Kultur. imPuls Verlag, Magdeburg 1993,

External links 

 

1896 births
1945 deaths
20th-century German painters
20th-century German male artists
German Expressionist painters
Artists from Magdeburg
German civilians killed in World War II